Dalcerides radians is a moth in the family Dalceridae. It was described by Walter Hopp in 1921. It is found in southern Brazil. The habitat consists of subtropical wet, subtropical moist and warm temperate moist forests.

The length of the forewings is 7–10 mm for males and 10–11 mm for females. The forewings are pale golden yellow with a silky luster. The scales are arranged to give the appearance of transverse undulating bands. The hindwings are pale yellow. Adults are on wing from September to May.

References

Moths described in 1921
Dalceridae
Moths of South America